Madison Township is a township in Greenwood County, Kansas, USA.  As of the 2000 census, its population was 1,155.

Geography
According to the USGS, it contains three cemeteries: Andrew, Blakely and Woods.

The streams of Bernard Branch, Holderman Creek, Kelly Branch, Moon Branch, North Branch Verdigris River, Rock Creek, South Branch Verdigris River and Tate Branch Creek run through this township.

Transportation
Madison Township contains one airport or landing strip, Godfrey Airport.

References
 USGS Geographic Names Information System (GNIS)

External links
 US-Counties.com
 City-Data.com

Townships in Greenwood County, Kansas
Townships in Kansas